Brave is the debut studio album by English singer Beau Dermott, released by Decca Records in 2017.

Track listing
All tracks produced by Steve Anderson and Cliff Masterson. All tracks are cover versions of existing songs, except for "Brave".

Charts

References

2017 debut albums